was a Japanese industrialist widely known today as the "father of Japanese capitalism", having introduced Western capitalism to Japan after the Meiji Restoration. He introduced many economic reforms including use of double-entry accounting, joint-stock corporations and modern note-issuing banks.

He founded the first modern bank based on joint stock ownership in Japan. The bank was aptly named The First National Bank (Dai Ichi Kokuritsu Ginkō, now merged into Mizuho Bank) and had the power to issue its own notes. Through this bank, he founded hundreds of other joint stock corporations in Japan. Many of these companies still survive to this day as quoted companies in the Tokyo Stock Exchange, which Shibusawa also founded. The Japanese Chamber of Commerce and Industry was founded by him as well. He was also involved in the foundation of many hospitals, schools, universities (including the first women's university), the Imperial Hotel in Tokyo and charitable organizations including the Japan Red Cross.

Another notable aspect of Shibusawa's career is that, despite being the founder of hundreds of corporations, he refused to maintain a controlling stake in these corporations, effectively preventing himself from forming a zaibatsu. What is known as the Shibusawa zaibatsu was a holding company to look after his estate for his family. The Shibusawa Zaibatsu did not hold any controlling stake in any companies. Despite his lowly origin as a farmer, he was granted the title of Viscount, while all other zaibatsu founders were awarded the title of Baron. He was also awarded Shōnii, Second Honour under the ritsuryō rank system, which is usually given to high-ranking nobility and prime ministers.
On April 9, 2019, it was announced that Eiichi would be the historical figure featured on Japanese ¥10000 banknotes expected to enter circulation around 2024.

Biography

Shibusawa was born on March 16, 1840, in a farmhouse in Chiaraijima (located in the present-day city of Fukaya in Saitama Prefecture). As a boy, he learned reading and writing from his father. He grew up helping with the family business of dry field farming, indigo production and sale, and silk raising and later studied the Confucian classics and the history of Japan under Odaka Junchu, a scholar who was his cousin.

Under the influence of sonnō jōi (expel the barbarians; revere the emperor) sentiment, he formulated a plan along with cousins and friends to capture Takasaki Castle and set fires in the foreign settlement in Yokohama. Ultimately, however, this plan was canceled and he moved on to Kyoto.

Shibusawa left his hometown at the age of twenty-three, and entered the service of Hitotsubashi Yoshinobu (then in line for the position of shōgun). He distinguished himself by his work in strengthening the household finances of the Hitotsubashi family.

When he was twenty-seven years old, he visited France and other European countries as a member of Tokugawa Akitake's delegation to the Exposition Universelle (1867). On this trip Shibusawa observed modern European societies and cultures for the first time, and realized the importance of industrial and economic development.

After returning from Europe at the news of the change of governments now known as the Meiji Restoration, he established the Shōhō Kaishō, one of the first joint-stock companies in Japan, in Shizuoka Prefecture. Afterwards, he was invited by the Meiji government to become a member of the Ministry of Finance, where he became a driving force in the building of a modern Japan as head of the Kaisei Kakari, or office of the Ministry of Finance in charge of reform.

In 1873 Shibusawa resigned from the Ministry of Finance and became the president of the Dai-ichi Bank (First National Bank). This was Japan's first modern bank, established under his own guidance while still employed by the Ministry of Finance. With this bank as a base, Shibusawa devoted himself to founding and encouraging businesses of all sorts.

Shibusawa was an advocate throughout his life of the idea that good ethics and business should be in harmony. The number of enterprises in which he was involved as founder or supporter is said to exceed five hundred, and includes Mizuho Financial Group, The 77 Bank, Tokio Marine Nichido, Imperial Hotel, Tokyo Stock Exchange, Tokyo Gas, Toyobo, Tokyu Corporation, Keihan Electric Railway, Taiheiyo Cement, Oji Paper Company, Sapporo Breweries, NYK Line, and the Gyeongin Railway and the Gyeongbu Railway in Korea. He was president of the Tokyo Chamber of Commerce. Moreover, he spearheaded many works for the betterment of society, and was an enthusiastic supporter of education, especially higher education in the field of business such as current Hitotsubashi University and current Tokyo Keizai University, higher education for women, and private schools. Shibusawa involved himself in some 600 projects related to education, social welfare and others. In addition, Shibusawa made efforts to promote the exchange of goods and good will across national boundaries through private-sector diplomacy. In 1902 he visited Germany, France and the United Kingdom.

1908: Baron Shibusawa and members of the Mitsui & Company, along with other Japanese business leaders greeted the first official U.S. Business delegation to visit Japan. This U.S. delegation was led by Frank A. Vanderlip accompanied by sixty members of the Associated Chambers of Commerce of the Pacific Coast, a business organization founded prior to U.S. Chamber of Commerce. Eiichi Shibusawa had invited these U.S. representatives to visit Japan to bridge their nations diplomatically and to promote increased business and commerce.

1909: In appreciation for the hospitality shown to the 1908 U.S. Business Delegation during their visit to Japan, the Associated Chambers of Commerce of the Pacific Coast invited Shibusawa and his business delegation to visit the U.S in 1909, where they toured 53 cities from coast to coast - travelling 11,000 miles over a three month period. The 1909 illustration to the right is linked a celebratory banquet reception held in Ithaca, New York, honoring the visit of the Shibusawa Delegation. The Japanese delegates were greeted by Governor David Rowland Francis (the future U.S. Secretary of Interior) and the Dean of the Arts College of Cornell University Charles H. Hull. One of the prominent speakers at this diplomatic goodwill event was Robert H. Treman.

To honor Baron Shibusawa’s 1915 visit to the United States, on December 2, 1915, a dinner event was hosted by the Japan Society of Manhattan at the grand ballroom of the Hotel Astor, where Viscount Sutemi Chinda Japanese Ambassador to the U.S. spoke of the growing positive relations between the U.S and Japan. There were 360 guests who attended this dinner and dance. On the following evening December 3, 1915, two former U.S. Presidents Theodore Roosevelt and William Howard Taft respectfully honored Baron Shibusawa by attending a diplomatic banquet reception held for him in New York City. The 1915 banquet photo illustration to the right is linked to this event; it is an enlarged sectional view of a larger photograph depicting this event. The full size of the actual original photo is: 20 inches by 12 inches. This photo may well be one of a kind, according to the Shibusawa Eiichi Memorial Foundation. There is no mention of the name of the photographer or any other details describing the event, other than the label written on the lower left corner of the photo which states, "Dinner to Baron Shibusawa. East & West Meeting, Sherry’s (Restaurant) New York City, Dec. 3, 1915.’’

This rare 1915 photo was surprisingly discovered while doing research for The Art of Peace, an illustrated biography that honors the friendship, alliance, and outstanding accomplishments of Prince Tokugawa and Baron Shibusawa. This 1915 diplomatic banquet event was attended by approximately sixty prominent members of U.S. and Japanese society that included presidents of universities, political rights activists, founders of publishing firms, journalists, leaders of banking and finance, and many other notable individuals. At the time, there was some newspaper coverage of this event, but surprisingly they made no mention of Presidents Theodore Roosevelt and William Howard Taft being in attendance to honor their distinguished foreign visitor, perhaps for security reasons, because WWI had just erupted in Europe with Japan already joining her democratic Europeans Allies, with the U.S. possibly to soon also enter the fray. This 1915 photo presents Baron Shibusawa Eiichi standing between two of his prominent Japanese colleagues. Shibusawa had been sitting at the other end of the huge banquet table, near former President Theodore Roosevelt; but for the sake of capturing this large gathering in one photograph, while at the same time highlighting Baron Shibusawa, the photographer creatively requested that Shibusawa come to the other end of the table to be closer to President Taft (who is at the far right, seated next to the gentleman whose image reveals only one half of his face). Standing at Shibusawa’s right side is the Japanese-American Dr. Jōkichi Takamine, one of the two individuals who hosted this banquet event. Dr. Takamine was a highly successful and respected chemist and businessman who helped found an international pharmaceutical company that continues to this day. Standing at Shibusawa’s left side is Count Chinda Sutemi Japanese Ambassador to the United States. Both Dr. Takamine and Ambassador Sutemi are closely linked to the gifting of cherry blossom trees to Washington, D.C. Dr. Takamine was the individual who generously first offered to pay for the cherry blossom trees that were to be gifted by Japan to Washington, D.C., and it was Count Chinda Sutemi’s wife and President Taft’s wife who each planted one of the first cherry blossom trees during a small goodwill gathering in Washington, D.C., in 1912, which would in future years evolve into the National Cherry Blossom Festival, an exciting, annual international commemorative goodwill event which is celebrated by thousands of American visitors and others from around the world.

Numerous distinguished guests from overseas visited the Shibusawa residence in Asukayama, where they talked candidly with him.

Shibusawa had served in various capacities for the last shogun of Japan, Tokugawa Yoshinobu. After the Tokugawa shogunate ended, Shibusawa continued as a friend and political ally of Yoshinobu's son Prince Iyesato Tokugawa (also known as Tokugawa Iesato). Together, these two impressive statesmen Eiichi Shibusawa and Iyesato Tokugawa strove to maintain democracy in Japan and promote international goodwill with the United States and with Japan's other allies.

In 1917, out of empathy for the suffering resulting from the enormous death and destruction in Europe during World War One, Prince Iyesato Tokugawa and Baron Eiichi Shibusawa, representing Japan, published a condolence booklet honoring her fellow Allies. Japan not only militarily supported her democratic allies’ in their war efforts, she also aided the Allies’ sick and wounded during the war. This condolence booklet described the Japanese creating an association that collected a monetary fund that was gifted to Allied nations to help with their health costs. Prince Iyesato Tokugawa was the president of this organization and Baron Eiichi Shibusawa and S. Shimada were its vice-presidents. Many of Japan’s top leaders contributed articles to this booklet expressing their support of the Allies. This booklet was published in a French and English edition. The booklet was titled: Japan to her Allies: A Message of Practical Sympathy from the Japan Association for Aiding the Sick and Wounded Soldiers and Others Suffering from the War in the Allied Countries. Published in Tokyo, Japan, 1917. Just seven months prior to his death, Theodore Roosevelt wrote a lengthy article for The New York Times, November 30, 1919, titled: "What the Japanese Have Stood For In World War," in which he. emphasized the great appreciation America should have for the Japanese people and for Japan's significant role in winning WWI.

During 1930, Prince Iyesato Tokugawa and Baron Eiichi Shibusawa sat side by side attending a diplomatic ceremony linked to U.S.–Japan relations. They were commemorating the first United States Minister to Japan Townsend Harris. This ceremony presented the unveiling of a monument honoring the memory of Townsend Harris. Minister Townsend Harris came to Japan in 1856 and opened the first U.S. consulate at the Temple Gyokusen-ji  in the city of Shimoda, Shizuoka Prefecture. Townsend Harris (October 3, 1804 – February 25, 1878) was a successful New York City merchant and the first United States Consul General to Japan. He negotiated the “Harris Treaty” between the U.S. and Japan and is credited as the diplomat who first opened the Empire of Japan to foreign trade and culture in the Edo period (Meiji Restoration period). Shibusawa became friends with Townsend Harris during Harris’s time in Japan. Also attending this commemorative event was Charles MacVeagh U.S. Ambassador to Japan, and Dr. Baron Yoshiro Sakatani, one of Japan's foremost economists, former mayor of Tokyo, and former minister of finance. Dr. Sakatani was the step-son of Baron Eiichi Shibusawa. Also attending this event was Prince Iyesato Tokugawa's son, Iemasa Tokugawa, then-former chancellor at the Japanese embassy in London, and recently appointed Japanese consul general for Sydney, Australia.

Shibusawa died at the age of ninety-one on November 11, 1931.

Honors

Grand Cordon of the Order of the Sacred Treasure (24 August 1911)  (Fourth Class: 19 July 1892)
Grand Cordon of the Order of the Rising Sun with Paulownia Flowers (10 November 1928)
Senior Second Rank (November 10, 1931)

The Nobel Prize 
Shibusawa was nominated for the Nobel Peace Prize in 1926 by the prime minister of Japan.

In fiction
Shibusawa Eiichi, mainly portrayed by Ryo Yoshisawa, is the main protagonist in the 60th Taiga Drama, Reach Beyond The Blue Sky, aired during 2021 on NHK.

Shibusawa, along with many other famous historical figures from the Meiji Restoration, is also a supporting character in the historical fantasy novel Teito Monogatari by Aramata Hiroshi.  In the 1988 adaptation, known in the west as Tokyo: The Last Megalopolis, he is portrayed by renowned Japanese actor Katsu Shintarō. In the animated adaptation his voice is done by Osamu Saka.

Baron Shibusawa is highlighted in the historical novel The Emperor and the Spy by Stan S. Katz. During the 1923 Great Kantō earthquake, Baron Shibusawa is shown actively engaged in assisting many of the Japanese who were injured during that major disaster. The friendship between Baron Shibusawa and Prince Iesato Tokugawa is also presented in this novel.

See also

Reach Beyond The Blue Sky
Japanese friendship dolls
Keizo Shibusawa
Suematsu Kenchō

References

Further reading

Hirschmeier, Johannes. Origins of Entrepreneurship in Meiji Japan. Cambridge: Harvard University Press, 1964.
 Katz, Stan S. The Art of Peace, an illustrated biography highlighting Prince Iyesato Tokugawa and Baron Eiichi Shibusawa.. (2019) 
Sagers, John. "Shibusawa Eiichi and the Merger of Confucianism and Capitalism in Modern Japan", in Education about Asia, Ann Arbor, MI: Association for Asian Studies, Winter 2014.
 Sagers, John H. "Purposeful Preservation of Shibusawa Eiichi’s Legacy." Confucian Capitalism (Palgrave Macmillan, Cham, 2018) pp. 217–234.
 Sagers, John H.  "Shibusawa Eiichi, Dai Ichi Bank, and the Spirit of Japanese Capitalism, 1860–1930". Shashi 3, no. 1 (2014). . online

 Shimada, Masakazu. "How Eiichi Shibusawa offered models of investment and management to introduce modern business practices into Japan." Japanese Yearbook on Business History 19 (2003): 9-31. online

Primary sources
 Shibusawa, Eiichi, and Teruko Craig. The autobiography of Shibusawa Eiichi: from peasant to entrepreneur (University of Tokyo Press, 1994).

External links

 
Shibusawa, Eiichi at National Diet Library, Japan

Japanese businesspeople
Samurai
Kazoku
Japanese government officials
Members of the House of Peers (Japan)
1840 births
1931 deaths
Recipients of the Order of the Sacred Treasure, 4th class
Recipients of the Order of the Sacred Treasure, 1st class
Recipients of the Order of the Paulownia Flowers
Riken personnel